Mladen Veselinović may refer to:
 Mladen Veselinović (Bosnian footballer) (b. 1993)
 Mladen Veselinović (Serbian footballer) (b. 1992)